is a Japanese former ice hockey player. He competed in the men's tournament at the 1998 Winter Olympics.

References

External links

1968 births
Living people
Japanese ice hockey players
Oji Eagles players
Olympic ice hockey players of Japan
Ice hockey players at the 1998 Winter Olympics
Sportspeople from Hokkaido